The Queens Arms is a Grade II listed public house at Hartfield Road, Cowden in Kent.
It is on the Campaign for Real Ale's National Inventory of Historic Pub Interiors.

It was built in the mid 19th century.
This unspoilt two bar pub was saved from closure in 2014 when the long standing landlady gave up her tenure. Elsie Maynard took over the licence from her mother Annie in 1973. The pub had been in the hands of the same family since 1913 and is still known locally as Annie's. 

Originally a Tied house of E. & H. Kelsey Brewery of Tunbridge Wells, house it passed to J.W. Green of Luton and later to Whitbread and Admiral Taverns. It is now in private hands.
It was famed for many years for having a hand painted sign "Lager not sold here" sign to the left of the front door.

References

Grade II listed pubs in Kent
National Inventory Pubs